Reuben Foster (February 7, 1833 – October 12, 1898) was an American politician and lawyer from Maine. Foster, a Republican, served three single-year terms in the Maine House of Representatives (1866-1867; 1870) and two single-year terms in the Maine Senate (1871-1872). In 1870, he was elected House Speaker and in 1872, he was elected Senate President.

In 1888, Waterville was incorporated as a city and elected Reuben Foster as its first mayor.

Foster was born in Bethel, Maine and graduated from Colby College in 1855. He practiced law in Waterville from 1858 until his death in 1898.

References

1833 births
1898 deaths
Mayors of Waterville, Maine
Speakers of the Maine House of Representatives
Republican Party members of the Maine House of Representatives
Presidents of the Maine Senate
People from Bethel, Maine
Colby College alumni
Maine lawyers
19th-century American politicians
19th-century American lawyers